Patrick O'Donoghue may refer to:

 Patrick O'Donoghue (bishop) (1934–2021), Irish Roman Catholic Bishop of Lancaster, England
 Patrick O'Donoghue (politician) (1930–1989), Northern Ireland politician
 Patrick O'Donoghue (Young Irelander) (died 1854), revolutionary